Muhammad Hafeez Qureshi (Urdu: محمد حفيظ قريشى) (28 January 1930 – 11 August 2007), SI, HI, known as Hafeez Qureshi, was a Pakistani nuclear scientist and a mechanical engineer, known for his classified work at WGS at the Pakistan Atomic Energy Commission (PAEC).

He was a director of PAEC's secretive divisions charged with testing nuclear weapons, he oversaw the work on weapon systems manufacturing and gained expertise on engineering applications of nuclear physics and applied mechanics. However, he is more noted for spearheading Pakistan's quest for nuclear capability.

Biography

Early life and education
Muhammad Hafeez Qureshi was born in Kapurthala, Punjab to a Punjabi Muslim family in 1930. His family emigrated to Pakistan after the Partition of India in 1947; only to settle in Karachi, Sindh. Upon matriculating from a local high school, Qureshi enrolled at Karachi University in 1956; he partly supported his studies by working as a motor mechanic. In his dormitory at the university, his schoolmate and friend was a future notable optical physicist Dr. Muhammad Jameel— who was also present when Pakistan tested its nuclear devices in Ras Koh Hills. He attained a Bachelor of Science (BSc) in physics and earned a scholarship to resume his studies at Michigan State University (MSU) in the United States.

At MSU, Qureshi enrolled in the engineering department and gained a Bachelor of Science (BS) in mechanical engineering, followed by a Master of Science (MS), in mechanical engineering His mechanical engineering thesis contained work on applications of the mechanics of materials. In 1960, he was admitted into the doctoral program in mechanical engineering at MSU, but left his Doctor of Philosophy (PhD) studies for unknown reasons.

After returning to Pakistan in 1960, Qureshi joined Karachi Mechanical Laboratories (KML) and was given charge of the Mechanical Engineering Department (MED). Shortly, he left KML and through Muhammad Jameel, Qureshi joined Pakistan Atomic Energy Commission (PAEC) in 1963, where he joined the physics staff led by Dr. Naeem Ahmad Khan.

Pakistan Atomic Energy Commission

After joining the Pakistan Atomic Energy Commission (PAEC), Qureshi joined the senior staff at the Atomic Energy Center located in Lahore in 1963, where he worked in the mechanical shop at the center. Qureshi supervised the installation of the experimental facility for particle physics research– a neutron generator. In 1965, Qureshi moved to Nilore to join Pakistan Institute of Nuclear Science and Technology (PINSTECH) where he was part of the team that supervised the construction of a nuclear pile —PARR-I— at PINSTECH in Nilore which went critical in 1965. While at PINSTECH, Qureshi grew closer to Dr. Naeem Ahmad Khan, a nuclear physicist, who was a director of the Nuclear Physics Division (NPD). Dr. Naeem Ahmad remained his lifelong mentor and friend who realized his extraordinary talent for adapting solutions of complex mechanical problems. Invited by Naeem Ahmad, Qureshi joined the division containing Sultan Mahmood and Dr. Samar Mubarakmand to engage in studies on meaningful methods of uranium enrichment.

In early of 1971, Dr. Naeem Ahmad founded the Radiation Isotope Application Division (RIAD) at PINSTECH where he called Qureshi to join the division under him. In December 1971, Qureshi was made director of RIAD with support provided from Dr. Naeem Ahmad.

1971 war and atomic bomb project

Soon after learning about India's 'Smiling Buddha' nuclear test, Qureshi was summoned by Munir Ahmad Khan in March 1974, and he attended a meeting with Munir Ahmad Khan, Abdus Salam, Riazuddin, Ishfaq Ahmad, and Munir Ahmad Rashid. At this meeting, Qureshi was tasked with developing the mechanical components, nuclear tampers, and explosive lenses necessary for detonation of the nuclear weapon. Instructions were given by Munir Ahmad Khan to Qureshi that he join hands on a project of national importance with another expert, Dr. Zaman Sheikh, a chemical engineer from the Defence Science & Technology Organization (DESTO). A codename, Wah Group Scientist (WGS), was given for the group that was established. Another session was held on the feasibility of the weapon, which was attended by Abdus Salam and Riazuddin as representatives of Theoretical Physics Group (TPG); Asghar Qadir and Munir Ahmad Rashid of Mathematical Physics Group; Ishfaq Ahmad of Nuclear Physics Division; and Qureshi and Dr. Zaman of the Wah Group Scientists (WGS). During the meeting, the word bomb was never used, instead the scientists used scientific research rationale. There, the scientists decided to develop an 'implosion' over the 'gun' type fission device citing economy in the use of fissile material.

The WGS also took initiatives in high precision mechanical and chemical components —how tampers would be developed to produce efficiency and high precision data – physics calculations – what would its appropriate time reaction be when the explosives make contact with nuclear material, high explosives—what kind of chemical material would be used, and triggering mechanisms —how the weapon would be detonated. PINSTECH had a lack of facilities to carry out these experiments in its laboratories, therefore on 25 March 1974, Abdus Salam, along with Munir Ahmad Khan and Riazuddin, visited the Pakistan Ordnance Factories (POF) where Salam held talks with Lieutenant-General Qamar Ali Mirza, where military engineers first built the Metallurgical Laboratory (ML) in Wah Cantonment in 1976. At ML, WGS developed the complex explosive 'lenses', chemical high-explosive materials, and triggering mechanisms, which was all completed in 1979. Concerns were raised with the absence of the computer numerical control (CNC) facility which was acquired in 1978. In 1979, Qureshi worked with Munir Ahmad Khan for the construction of a third nuclear pile–PARR-III– nearby at Nilore. The reactor's design process was led by Munir Ahmad Khan and Qureshi, and the Pakistan Army Corps of Engineers led the construction of the plutonium separation reactor. In 1980, the reactor west critical under Ishfaq Ahmad and attained its full power in 1981. The reactor was reprocessed at 50% efficiency, and produced the first batch of weapons grade plutonium in 1982.

Directorate for Technical Development (DTD)

On 11 March 1983, Qureshi and Zaman had eye-witnessed the successful 'cold' fission test, codename Kirana-I, near the Kirana Hills. Both engineers were charged with another task to form, this division was known as the Directorate for Technical Development (DTD). DTD examined the same problems as the previous WGS, this time with improvising techniques every time PAEC carried their tests. In the 1990s, DTD had carried out witnessed tests of 24 different improved designs, developed by TPG. PAEC had followed a very strict policy to develop such programmes critical to national security under extreme security. Qureshi later went on to participate in a highly clandestine missile research and development programme, under Samar Mubarakmand, in 1987.

Reciprocating India's second test, Pokhran-II, in 1998, the Prime Minister of Pakistan, Nawaz Sharif, gave authorization to PAEC to carry out more nuclear tests, codename Chagai-I, in the Ras Koh area of Chagai Hills. Eventually, Qureshi participated and witnessed the first five tests of nuclear devices, evidently made from highly enriched uranium (HEU). On 30 May, PAEC carried out another test, codename Chagai-II, in the Kharan desert. It was reported to be a plutonium weapon-grade device.

Legacy

In 2005, Qureshi sought retirement from the Pakistan Atomic Energy Commission, and joined the mechanical engineering faculty at the Pakistan Institute of Engineering and Applied Sciences. In recognition of his services, Qureshi was the recipient of Pakistan's highest civilian honors, including the Sitara-e-Imtiaz (1992) and Hilal-e-Imtiaz (2002) conferred by the President of Pakistan. Qureshi died in Wah Cantonment due to heart failure on 11 August 2007.

Bibliography

See also
 List of mechanical engineers

References

External links
 Pakistanpedia
 When Mountain Moves
 An Unsung Hero Passes away

1938 births
2007 deaths
People from Karachi
University of Karachi alumni
Pakistani physicists
Michigan State University alumni
20th-century Pakistani engineers
Fellows of the American Society of Mechanical Engineers
Pakistani mechanical engineers
Pakistani nuclear physicists
Weapons scientists and engineers
Recipients of Sitara-i-Imtiaz
Recipients of Hilal-i-Imtiaz
Rocket scientists
Project-706
Academic staff of Pakistan Institute of Engineering and Applied Sciences
Nuclear weapons scientists and engineers